Diuris nigromontana, commonly known as the Black Mountain leopard orchid,  is a species of orchid which is endemic to the Australian Capital Territory. It was first formally described in 2008 by David Jones from a specimen collected on Black Mountain and the description was published in The Orchadian. Black Mountain leopard orchid is only known from the Australian Capital Territory.

References

nigromontana
Orchids of the Australian Capital Territory
Plants described in 2008